Operation Portcullis (1–5 December 1942) was the dispatch of Convoy MW 14 to Malta from Port Said. The convoy followed the success of Operation Stoneage (16–20 November) which had raised the Siege of Malta. Four merchant ships were escorted to Malta by seven destroyers of the 12th Destroyer Flotilla, supported by three cruisers of the 15th Cruiser Squadron and three destroyers from Alexandria.

The convoy was met by Force K from Malta with two cruisers and four destroyers. MW 14 was not attacked by Axis forces en route or while unloading which was complete by 9 December. Lack of opposition led to the sailing of pairs of ships to Malta with ordinary western desert convoys as far as Benghazi, where they would rendezvous with escorts from Malta and be guarded by Force K against a sortie by Italian ships from Taranto.

Background

Malta

In the Autumn of 1942, the British regained control of the central Mediterranean, through the combined effects of the survival of Malta, brought about by the success of Operation Pedestal (3–15 August 1942) and Operation Stoneage (16–20 November), the Second Battle of Alamein (23 October – 11 November) in Egypt and Operation Torch (8–16 November) the Allied invasion of French North Africa. Offensive operations from Malta had been resumed with the supplies delivered by Pedestal and intensified with those of Stoneage. Axis shipping losses contributed to the chronic fuel shortage that constrained  and limited it to delaying actions back to the Tunisian border. With the revival of Malta as an offensive base after the arrival of the Stoneage convoy, the short journey by Axis ships from Italy to Tunis and Tripoli became much more hazardous. Allied submarines sank 14 Italian ships in October and in November the air anti-shipping offensive had similar success, sinking 21 ships.

The fast Abdiel class minelayer  sailed from Alexandria on 10 November and arrived on 12 November with powdered milk, cereals and meat, leaving for Gibraltar that day to collect mines and lay them off Cape Bon.  detached from a convoy bringing supplies to North Africa for Operation Torch and arrived on 18 November.

North Africa

As the  retreated, the Axis air forces had to leapfrog backwards from airfield to airfield. The Desert Air Force swiftly took over abandoned airfields and the landing grounds at Gazala were open by 17 November and Martuba, near Derna, was operational on 19 November; the Navy began scheduled convoys to Benghazi on 26 November. Ultra intercepts of Axis Enigma machine cyphers revealed that on 24 November, the  had only a few days' fuel left and on 3 December, that Italian troops were withdrawing to Buerat. By the middle of November the  retreat from Alamein had reached El Agheila.

Prelude

Axis command

The Axis command structure in the Mediterranean was centralised at the top and fragmented below. Benito Mussolini had monopolised authority over the Italian armed forces since 1933 by taking the offices of Minister of War, Minister of the Navy and Minister of the Air Force. Albert Kesselring of the  commanded German ground forces in the theatre as Commander-in-Chief South (OB Süd) but had no authority over Axis operations in North Africa or the organisation of convoys to Libya. Fliegerkorps II and Fliegerkorps X were subordinate to the usual  chain of command. Since November 1941, Kesselring had exercised some influence over the conduct of the German naval operations in the Mediterranean as the nominal head of Naval Command Italy but this was subordinate to the  chain of command. German service rivalries obstructed co-operation and there was little unity of effort between German and the Italian forces in the Mediterranean.

Convoy plan

Convoy MW 14 consisted of the Agwimonte (6,679 gross register tons [grt]), Alcoa Prospector (6,797 grt), Suffolk (13,890 grt) and Glenartney (9,795 grt) which had a naval crew.

Convoy MW 14
During the evening of 1 December, convoy MW 14 departed Port Said and on 2 December, rendezvoused with the tanker Yorba Linda and two Hunt-class destroyers. Next day, the cruiser Orion and three destroyers arrived from Alexandria and on 4 December, when south-west of Crete, the convoy was joined by Force K, comprising two cruisers and four destroyers from Malta. The convoy reached Grand Harbour early on 5 December and received the customary welcome from the populace and garrison. As the swift unloading of the ships began, congestion in the harbour was relieved by Operation MH 2, the dispatch of Convoy ME 11 on 7 December, containing Yoruba Linda from MW 14 and eight ships from Pedestal and Stoneage. By 9 December the ships were unloaded.

Aftermath

Analysis

Stoneage and Portcullis delivered  of cargo, not including fuel oils; once the Portcullis ships had unloaded, enough flour was on the island to last until May 1943, food and fodder were sufficient until March and cooking fuels until April, even after some small ration increases. The success of Portcullis led to the institution of the Quadrangle operations, regular voyages by pairs of ships accompanying ordinary west-bound convoys supplying the Eighth Army in its advance from El Agheila to Tunisia. The ships would be met off Benghazi by escorts from Malta and sail northwards to Malta, protected by the 15th Cruiser Squadron from a possible sortie by the Italian fleet at Taranto.

See also
 Battle of the Mediterranean

Notes

Footnotes

References

Books
 
 
 
 
 

Journals

External links
 Chronology of the siege of Malta, 1940–43: Merlins over Malta
 The Supply of Malta 1940–1942, Part 1 of 3 Arnold Hague, naval-history com

Battle of the Mediterranean
Malta Convoys
Mediterranean convoys of World War II
Naval battles and operations of World War II involving the United Kingdom
November 1942 events